The Hécate II is the standard heavy sniper rifle and anti-materiel rifle of the French Army, sometimes known as the FR-12.7 ( or "12.7 mm calibre repeating rifle"). It is manufactured by PGM Précision of France. This is the largest weapon manufactured by PGM, chambered for the .50 BMG (12.7×99mm NATO) cartridge. The name of the rifle is derived from the ancient Greek goddess Hecate.

Design 
Its design is the same metallic-skeleton as used in other similar rifles in the PGM family, only scaled up. The barrel of the Hécate is manufactured by FN Herstal and is lined with Stellite alloy which is also used for large calibre machine guns. This increases the barrel's longevity. It is fitted with a high-efficiency muzzle brake which reduces the felt recoil to about the level expected of a 7.62×51mm NATO-chambered rifle.
The rifle is equipped with both an adjustable front bipod and a rear monopod for maximum accuracy. The stock is also adjustable. The Hecate II 
was a heavy firearm and weighs up to 35.27 pounds at most.

The standard-issue sight used with the Hécate II is the SCROME LTE J10 F1 10× telescope.

In popular culture 
The anti-materiel rifle in the video game Fallout: New Vegas is heavily influenced by the design of the Hécate II. Although the rifle is not widely used in the United States, the choice of it description was primarily aesthetics, as explained by Fallout: New Vegas game director Josh Sawyer: "I based the anti-materiel rifle on the Hécate II because honestly I was/am sick of seeing Barretts in games and I think the Hécate II looks better."

Users 

 
 Marine Corps Special Operations Battalion
  – Used By Rapid Deployment Forces and Black Cobra
 
 

 
 
 
 
 
 
 
  - SOBT and SKSO

Gallery

See also 
 FR F2
 PGM 338
 PGM Ultima Ratio

References

External links 

 PGM Précision
 Hecate II data sheet
 User Manual PGM Hecate II
 Modern Firearms
 PGM Hécate II 12,7x99 picture gallery
 SCROME 

.50 BMG sniper rifles
Bolt-action rifles of France
Sniper rifles of France
Anti-materiel rifles
Military equipment introduced in the 1990s